Assistant Secretary of the Air Force (Manpower & Reserve Affairs) is the title of a civilian office in the United States Department of the Air Force. Along with the four other Assistant Secretaries of the Air Force, the Assistant Secretary of the Air Force (Manpower & Reserve Affairs) assists the United States Secretary of the Air Force and the United States Under Secretary of the Air Force.

By law, the Assistant Secretary of the Air Force (Manpower & Reserve Affairs) is appointed by the President of the United States from civilian life with the advice and consent of the United States Senate." One of the Assistant Secretaries serves as Assistant Secretary of the Air Force (Manpower & Reserve Affairs) and has "as his principal duty the overall supervision of manpower and reserve component affairs of the Department of the Air Force."

Alex Wagner is currently serving as the assistant Secretary of the Air Force since June 10, 2022.

List of Assistant Secretaries of the Air Force (Manpower & Reserve Affairs) (incomplete list)

References

 
United States Air Force